The Theodor Seuss Geisel Award is a literary award by the American Library Association (ALA) that annually recognizes the "author(s) and illustrator(s) of the most distinguished book for beginning readers published in English in the United States during the preceding year." The winner(s) receive a bronze medal at the ALA Annual Conference, presented by the Association for Library Service to Children (ALSC) division of ALA.

The award is named for Theodor Geisel, also known as Dr. Seuss, who once said, "Children want the same things we want: to laugh, to be challenged, to be entertained and delighted." 
It was established in 2004 and inaugurated in 2006 for 2005 publications.

A few runners up are termed Theodor Seuss Geisel Honor Books; their authors and illustrators receive certificates.

Criteria
 The book must encourage and support the beginning reader.
 The book must be published in English in the United States during the preceding year. 
 There are no limitations as to the character of the book considered except that it will be original and function successfully as a book for beginning readers.
 The author(s) or illustrator(s) must be citizens or residents of the United States.
 The "author(s) and illustrator(s)" may include co-authors and co-illustrators. The author(s) and illustrator(s) may be awarded the medal posthumously.
 The text must be directed at readers from pre-K through Grade 2.
 The illustrations must function as keys or clues to the text.
 Fiction, non-fiction, and poetry are all eligible.
 Reprints and compilations are not eligible.
 Subject matter must be intriguing enough to motivate the child to read.
 The book may or may not include short "chapters".
 New words should be added slowly enough to make learning them a positive experience.
 Words should be repeated to ensure knowledge retention.
 Sentences must be simple and straightforward.
 There must be a minimum of 24 pages.
 Books may not be longer than 96 pages.

Recipients

Multiple awards 
 Tedd Arnold received honors in 2006, 2010, and (with Martha Hamilton, and Mitch Weiss) 2018.
 Cece Bell received honors in 2013 and 2020.
 Dori Hillestad Butler received honors in 2018 and 2019.
 Kate DiCamillo won the 2011 award (with co-author Alison McGhee and illustrator Tony Fucile). She received an honor in 2007.
 Jonathan Fenske received honors in 2016 and 2022.
 Kevin Henkes received honors in 2014 and 2016.
 Paul Meisel received honors in 2012 and 2018.
 David Milgrim received honors in 2017 and 2019.
 Greg Pizzoli won the 2014 award. He received honors in 2017 and 2020.
 Antoinette Portis received honors in 2007 and 2023.
 Sergio Ruzzier received honors in 2019 and 2023.
 Cynthia Rylant won the award in 2006 and received an honor in 2015.
 Laura Vaccaro Seeger received honors in 2008 and 2009.
 Corey R. Tabor won the award in 2019 and 2022.
 Mo Willems won the 2008 and 2009 awards. He received honors in 2011, 2012, 2013, 2014, and 2015.

See also

References

American children's literary awards
American Library Association awards
Awards established in 2004
Dr. Seuss
English-language literary awards